Ener1 is a company developing energy storage technology building compact lithium-ion-powered batteries for the transportation, utility grid and industrial electronics markets. Headquartered in Indianapolis, Indiana, the company has manufacturing locations in the United States and Korea. Ener1 also develops commercial fuel cell products and nanotechnology-based materials. Ener1 filed for Chapter 11 bankruptcy protection on January 26, 2012. It completed restructuring of its debt and emerged from bankruptcy on March 30, 2012.

Ener1 received a $118.5 million grant from the Department of Energy in 2010 via the American Recovery and Reinvestment Act of 2009. The company traded on the over the counter market under the symbol HEV.  It was de-listed from the NASDAQ Stock Market on October 28, 2011 prior to its January 2012 bankruptcy filing.

External links
 Official website

References

Companies formerly listed on the Nasdaq